Keewaydinoquay Pakawakuk Peschel (1919 – July 21,1999) was a scholar, ethnobotanist, herbalist, medicine woman, teacher and author. She claimed she was an Anishinaabeg Elder of the Crane Clan.  She was born in Michigan around 1919 and spent time on Garden Island, a traditional Anishinaabeg homeland.

Biography
According to her biography, Keewaydinoquay was born in a fishing boat en route to the hospital from the Manitou Islands, which capsized shortly thereafter, and her survival was interpreted as miraculous. Her childhood name, meaning "Walks with Bears", derived from an incident where as a toddler she was left on a blanket as her parents gathered blueberries, returning to see her standing by bears, eating blueberries off the bushes. Her adult name Giiwedinokwe, recorded as "Keewaydinoquay", means "Woman of the North[west Wind]" and came from her vision quest.  

She claimed she apprenticed with the noted Anishinaabeg medicine woman Nodjimahkwe from the age of 9 and worked for many years as a medicine woman, at a time when her people had little access to conventional medical care and when conventional medical care failed to cure them, healing more than several patients deemed to be terminally ill. At the age of 57 she decided to study anthropology, realizing that people would listen to her more if she had a degree. She received a Master of Education Degree from Wayne State University, and had finished all course work for a Ph.D. in ethnobotany at the University of Michigan. She was awarded the Michigan Conservation Teacher of the Year in 1975 for her "Outstanding Work in the Field of Conservation". She taught classes in ethnobotany as well as philosophy of the Great Lakes American Indians at University of Wisconsin–Milwaukee where she was a professor in the 1980s, and lectured at many herbal conferences. She was consulted for many prestigious books, including several on Great Lakes indigenous plant use.

She lived in Ann Arbor, Milwaukee, Leland, and most notably at her heart's home, Garden Island. She was the author of numerous books on herbs, Native American medicine and rare legends for children and adults. 

Keewaydinoquay founded the Miniss Kitigan Drum, a non-profit organization supporting the preservation and evolution of Great Lakes Native American traditions. Many referred to Keewaydinoquay lovingly as Nookomis (Grandmother). The group has ties with established and recognized tribes in the area. She was the subject of controversy, much of it stemming from her willingness to teach those of other than native backgrounds. She started doing this at a time when native people had just secured their abilities to openly practice traditional ceremonial rites and religious observances. Kee said it "broke her heart" that she could find no Native peoples interested in learning about their own culture, and she offered her teachings to non-natives as the only way of preserving her heritage. She said to critics that the time was late, and that people of good hearts and like minds needed to work together to offset the users and those that were actively hurting the earth. Some other elders at the time affirmed the wisdom of this, and later many who had earlier criticized her came to appreciate the wisdom of these teachings and proclaim them themselves. 

She died on July 21, 1999 and was honored with a traditional Midewiwin ceremony on Garden Island. In March 2002, the Holy Hill Trust of Leland was awarded a Michigan Humanities Council grant to develop a book tentatively titled "The LifeStory of Keewaydinoquay". A book covering her childhood was published by the University of Michigan Press in 2006 and was named one of the Notable Books of Michigan in 2007. The final title of this first book is "Keewaydinoquay, Stories From My Youth". The second book telling about her adult life was supported by another grant from the Michigan Humanities Council. It was published in 2013 by Trafford Publishing, edited by WeTahn Lee Boisvert, and is titled "Cedar Songs".

Publications
 Peschel, Keewaydinoquay M. (1987) "Dear Grandfathers", excerpt from Truth Is Stranger
 Peschel, Keewaydinoquay M. (1998) Puhpohwee for the People: a narrative account of some uses of fungi among the Ahnishinaabeg 
 Peschel, Keewaydinoquay M. (1979) "Directions We Know: Walk in Honor" in Miniss Kitigan Drum, Garden Island, MI 
 Peschel, Keewaydinoquay. (1978) Jawendamowin Nah: Happiness in the Half-World?/My Reverend Grandfather Challenges Coprinus Atramentarius.  Botanical Museum of Harvard University.
 Peschel, Keewaydinoquay. "The Legend of Miskwedo". Journal of Psychedelic Drugs, 11(1-2):29-31, January–June 1979. 
 Peschel, Keewaydinoquay M. (2006) Stories from my Youth. University of Michigan Press
 Peschel, Keewaydinoquay "Nkomis" (1977) Mukwah Miskomin or KinnickKinnick "Gift of Bear". Miniss Kitigan Drum, Garden Island, MI
 Peschel, Keewaydinoquay "Nkomis" (1978) Min: Anishinabag Ogimaawi-minan / Blueberry: First Fruit of the People. Miniss Kitigan Drum, Garden Island, MI

See also

 Herbalism
 Pharmacognosy
 Botany
 Ethnobotany
 Anishinaabeg
 Medicine woman
 Native American
 Ojibwa

References
 Bloom, Cindy. Nakomis Keewaydinoquay Peschel Woman of the Northwest Wind
 https://web.archive.org/web/20091026005033/http://geocities.com/soarring/wings/Wings18/Article04.htm
 Giblin, Nan J. "Keewaydinoquay, Woman-of-the-Northwest-Wind: The Life and Philosophy of a Native American Teacher" in Counseling & Values, April 1998, Vol. 42
 Peschel, Keewaydinoquay M. (1987) "Dear Grandfathers", excerpt from Truth Is Stranger
 Peschel, Keewaydinoquay M. (1998) Puhpohwee for the People: a narrative account of some uses of fungi among the Ahnishinaabeg 
 Peschel, Keewaydinoquay M. (1979) "Directions We Know: Walk in Honor" in Miniss Kitigan Drum, Garden Island, MI

1919 births
1999 deaths
Herbalists
Native American writers
University of Michigan alumni
Wayne State University alumni
University of Wisconsin–Milwaukee faculty
Ethnobotanists
Indigenous American traditional healers
20th-century American botanists
Native American people from Michigan